Achaea obvia is a species of moth of the family Erebidae. It was described by George Hampson in 1913 and is found in Africa, including Malawi, Nigeria and South Africa.

References

Achaea (moth)
Lepidoptera of West Africa
Erebid moths of Africa
Moths described in 1913